The Rhuys Peninsula is located in the département of Morbihan in the region of Brittany in northwestern France.

Three communes are located on the peninsula:
 Sarzeau, the largest, covering 50% of the area of the peninsula
 Arzon
 Saint-Gildas-de-Rhuys

Landforms of Morbihan
Peninsulas of Metropolitan France
Landforms of Brittany